The Spice Boys were six neophyte and two-term congressmen of the House of Representatives of the Philippines openly critical of the administration during Joseph Estrada's term as President of the Philippines. The group's name is an allusion to the British girl-group, the Spice Girls. They also played a key role in Estrada's removal from office.

The Estrada administration's equivalent of this opposition clique was a seven-member group of congressmen Estrada christened as the "Bright Boys".

Background
The 1998 Philippine general election ushered in a wave of neophyte congressmen into the House of Representatives, filling 140 seats of the 220-seat Lower House. About a fifth of its members were under 40 years of age, roughly equivalent to Generation X. This influx of young blood changed the way legislative business was undertaken and the image of the Filipino politician, most of whom were derided as trapos or "TRAditional POliticians". Incidentally, the Spanish word trapo means "rag", as in rag doll or dish rag.

After the Lakas-NUCD party was reduced to 25 members at the height of the Charter-change debate in 1999 and became the minority bloc in the House, six young congressmen became media sensations due to their fervent opposition to the issue of making changes to the Philippine Constitution. This group came to be dubbed by the media as the "Spice Boys", effectively becoming the face and voice of the opposition. As of 2001, the members of the group are no longer in the opposition and are holding positions in the Cabinet or Congress.

Composition
The group consisted of:

 Rolando Andaya, Jr. – 1st District, Camarines Sur
 Robert Ace Barbers – 2nd District, Surigao del Norte
 Michael Defensor – 3rd District, Quezon City
 Hernani Braganza – 1st District, Pangasinan
 Federico Sandoval II – Navotas-Malabon
 Juan Miguel Zubiri – 3rd District, Bukidnon
 Magtanggol Gunigundo II – lone District, Valenzuela

Post EDSA II
After the EDSA Revolution of 2001, the Spice Boys were assigned key positions in the Arroyo administration. In 2003, the Spice Boys pledged their support for Gloria Macapagal Arroyo's 2004 Presidential campaign. In 2004, three were given committee chairmanships in the House of Representatives. Andaya became chairman of the appropriations committee; Barbers headed the accounts committee, and Zubiri, the committee on legislative franchises. Defensor became head of the Housing and Urban Development Coordinating Council, while Braganza took over as agrarian reform secretary.

See also
 11th Congress of the Philippines
 Bombay Talkie

References

Living people
Political party factions in the Philippines
Members of the House of Representatives of the Philippines
Year of birth missing (living people)